Pobit Kamak is a village located in Sarnitsa Municipality, Pazardzhik Province, Southern Bulgaria. The population is 641.

Geography 
The village is situated on the western Rhodopes, a mountainous region, encompassing it on all sides. It is  surrounded by mountain hills - to the south-west Divite kozi, while to the south - the 1938 metres high Beslet Peak.

Religion 
Islam is the predominant religion in the village.

References 

Villages in Pazardzhik Province